Eulepidotis deiliniaria is a moth of the family Erebidae. It is found in the Neotropical realm, including Mexico. It was first described by George Hampson in 1926.

References

Moths described in 1926
deiliniaria